Eleme is a town at  in Dangme West District, Greater Accra Region, Ghana, near the mouth of the Volta River, and between Bokuve and Heluvi.

Populated places in the Greater Accra Region